The Breakthrough of the Year is an annual award for the most significant development in scientific research made by the AAAS journal Science, an academic journal covering all branches of science. Originating in 1989 as the Molecule of the Year,  and inspired by Time Man of the Year, it was renamed the Breakthrough of the Year in 1996.

Molecule of the Year 

 1989 PCR and DNA polymerase
 1990 the manufacture of synthetic diamonds
 1991 buckminsterfullerene
 1992 nitric oxide
 1993 p53
 1994 DNA repair enzyme

Breakthrough of the Year 
 1996: Understanding HIV
 1997: Dolly the sheep, the first mammal to be cloned from adult cells
 1998: Accelerating universe
 1999: Prospective stem-cell therapies
 2000: Full genome sequencing
 2001: Nanocircuits or Molecular circuit
 2002: RNA interference
 2003: Dark energy
 2004: Spirit rover landed on Mars
 2005: Evolution in action
 2006: Proof of the Poincaré conjecture
 2007: Human genetic variation
 2008: Cellular reprogramming
 2009: Ardipithecus ramidus
 2010: The first quantum machine
 2011: HIV treatment as prevention (HPTN 052)
 2012: Discovery of the Higgs boson
 2013: Cancer immunotherapy
 2014: Rosetta comet mission
 2015: CRISPR genome-editing method
 2016: First observation of gravitational waves
 2017: Neutron star merger (GW170817)
 2018: Single cell sequencing
 2019: A black hole made visible.
 2020: COVID-19 vaccine, developed and tested at record speed 
 2021: An AI brings protein structures to all 
 2022: James Webb Space Telescope debut

See also
Other Top 10 Breakthroughs of the Year:
 Physics World (physics)
 Wired (website) (sciences)

References

Science and technology awards
American Association for the Advancement of Science
Awards established in 1989
Awards established in 1996
Scientific research awards